Gagari (also known as Jelu Gagari) it is a village of Tinvari Tehsil of Jodhpur district, Rajasthan, India . It has pin code is 342306

References 

Villages in Jodhpur district